The 2019–20 All-Ireland Senior Club Hurling Championship was the 50th staging of the All-Ireland Senior Club Hurling Championship, the Gaelic Athletic Association's premier inter-county club hurling tournament. The championship began on 27 October 2019 and ended on 19 January 2020.

Ballyhale Shamrocks of Kilkenny were the defending champions.

On 18 January 2020, Ballyhale Shamrocks won the championship after an 0-18 to 0-15 defeat of Borris-Ileigh in the All-Ireland final at Croke Park. This was their 8th championship title overall and their second title in succession.

T. J. Reid from the Ballyhale Shamrocks club was the championship's top scorer with 2-53.

Competition format

County Championships

The top hurling teams in Ireland's counties compete in their senior club championship. Each county decides the format for determining their county champions – it can be knockout, double-elimination, league, etc or a combination.

Only single club teams are allowed to enter the All-Ireland Club championship. If a team which is an amalgamation of two or more clubs, a divisional team or a university team wins a county's championship, a single club team will represent that county in the provincial championship as determined by that county's championship rules. Normally it is the club team that exited the county championship at the highest stage.

Provincial Championships

Leinster, Munster and Ulster organise a provincial championship for their participating county champions. Connacht discontinued their senior club championship after 2007 but they do organise intermediate and junior championships. The Galway champions represent Connacht in the All-Ireland senior club semi-finals as Galway club hurling is at higher level than the hurling in the other four Connacht counties.

Some Leinster, Munster and Ulster counties enter their senior champions in the All-Ireland intermediate club championship (tier 2) as it is recognised that club hurling is weak in those counties.

All matches are knock-out. Two ten minute periods of extra time are played each way if it's a draw at the end of normal time in all matches including the final. If the score is still level after extra time the match is replayed.

All-Ireland

The two semi-finals will be played on the weekend 4–5 January 2020 with the final scheduled for 19 January 2020 in Croke Park. The All-Ireland final was previously played on St. Patrick's Day, the 17th of March.

All matches are knock-out. Two ten minute periods of extra time are played each way if it's a draw at the end of normal time in the semi-finals or final. If the score is still level after extra time the match is replayed.

Initial Schedule

County championships April 2019 to November 2019
Provincial championships October 2019 to December 2019
All-Ireland semi-finals 4–5 January 2020
All-Ireland final 19 January 2020

Team Summaries

Provincial championships

Leinster Senior Club Hurling Championship

Quarter-finals

Semi-finals

Final

Munster Senior Club Hurling Championship

Quarter-final

Semi-finals

Final

Ulster Senior Club Hurling Championship
Semi-finals

Final

All-Ireland Senior Club Hurling Championship

Semi-finals

Final

Top Scorers

Top scorers overall

Top scorers in a single game

References

2019 in hurling
2020 in hurling
All-Ireland Senior Club Hurling Championship